Currier is a surname. Notable people with the surname include:

 Althea Currier (born 1942), popular glamour model
 Andy Currier, English rugby league footballer of the 1980s and 1990s
 Bill Currier (born 1955), former American football defensive back
 Bill Currier (baseball), American college baseball coach
 Bob Currier (born 1949), retired Canadian professional ice hockey player
 Charles Warren Currier (1857–1918), first Bishop of the Roman Catholic Diocese of Matanzas
 Chester Currier (1946–2007), newspaper and magazine columnist
 Frank Currier (1857–1928), American actor and director
 Frank Dunklee Currier (1853–1921), U.S. Representative from New Hampshire
 Guy W. Currier (1867–1930), lawyer and politician in Massachusetts
 James Currier (20th century), English footballer
 John Currier (1951-2020), United States Coast Guard admiral
 Joseph Merrill Currier (1820–1884), Canadian member of parliament and businessman
 Lyman Currier (born 1994), American freestyle skier
 Moody Currier (1806–1898), lawyer and banker
 Nathan Currier (born 1960), American composer
 Nathaniel Currier (1813–1888), American lithographer
 Richard C. Currier (1892–1984), American film editor
 Ruth Currier (1926–2011), American dancer and choreographer
 Sebastian Currier (born 1959), American composer

Occupational surnames